The Comedian is a 2012 British drama film, written and directed by Tom Shkolnik as his feature debut. The movie was shot in central London and follows the life of Ed (Edward Hogg) as it attemps to paint a vivid picture of the city. Shkolnik was nominated for Best Newcomer at the 2012 London Film Festival.

Plot
Ed works an office job as a cancer insurance call-center operator by day, a job he seems not to enjoy, especially as he's in his early thirties. The movie details the hardships faced in London as Ed moonlights as a stand-up comedian, and shows the different dilemmas faced by bisexual men as Ed experiences turmoil—emotional, sexual and professional—and ends up retreating into himself to observe his environs. His personal life is also in disarray as he is torn between a newfound love, artist Nathan (Nathan Stewart-Jarrett), and his best friend and flatmate Elisa, who develops issues with the boyfriend.

In the end, Ed arguably sees the proverbial light at the end of the tunnel after a taxi ride with a Zimbabwean driver, feeling sparks of hope in his seemingly failing life.

References

External links

BFI interview with writer-director Tom Shkolnik

2012 drama films
2012 films
British LGBT-related films
Films set in London
British drama films
LGBT-related drama films
2012 LGBT-related films
2010s English-language films
2010s British films